Balbigny is a commune in the Loire department in central France.

History
Balbigny owes its name to a Roman general named Balbinius who based himself here in order to conduct a war.   Nothing survives from this period. The earliest identified traces of Balbigny date from 1090.

During the eighteenth and nineteenth centuries, before the Loire was channelled, Balbigny was a village of boatmen, known for flat bottomed boats known as Rambertes which were used to transport the coal mined at Saint-Étienne. The loaded Rambertes arrived from Saint-Rambert and stopped off at Balbigny where the boat crews were changed, taking the boats to the next change-over point at Roanne. All this changed in August 1832 with the arrival of the third oldest railway line in France which connected Andrézieux-Bouthéon with Roanne, passing Balbigny en route. An extension of the rail network in 1913 saw Balbigny connected with Saint-Germain-Laval and Régny. The coal was therefore transported by rail, but the railway also gave farmers in the district access to a wider range of markets for their produce.

The road bridge crossing the Loire was destroyed in 1940 in order to hold back advancing German troops, and a ferry service was introduced to permit the river to be crossed. The bridge was rebuilt in 1950.

Population

Twin towns
Balbigny is twinned with:

  Chaumont, Haute-Marne, France

See also
Communes of the Loire department

References

Communes of Loire (department)